Nathaniel S. Borenstein (born September 23, 1957) is an American computer scientist.
He is one of the original designers of the MIME protocol for formatting multimedia Internet electronic mail and sent the first e-mail attachment.

Biography
Borenstein received a B.A. in Mathematics and Religious Studies from Grinnell College in 1980,  and a Ph.D in Computer Science from Carnegie Mellon University in 1985. Previously he attended Ohio State University (1974–75), Deep Springs College, California (1975–76), and the Hebrew University of Jerusalem, Israel (1978–79). While at CMU, he co-developed the email component of the Andrew Project. The Andrew Message System was the first multi-media electronic mail system to become used outside of a laboratory. In 1989 he became a member of technical staff at Bellcore (Bell Communications Research). There he developed a series of standards so the various electronic mail systems could exchange multimedia messages in a common way.  He is responsible for sending the first MIME email attachment on March 11, 1992.

Borenstein was founder of First Virtual Holdings in 1994, called "the first cyberbank" by the Smithsonian Institution, and NetPOS.com in 2000. He worked at IBM as distinguished engineer starting in 2002 at Cambridge, Massachusetts. He then became chief scientist at email management company Mimecast in June 2010.

He is author of Programming As If People Mattered: Friendly Programs, Software Engineering, and Other Noble Delusions (Princeton University Press, 1994) .  He received the New York University Olive Branch Award for writing about peace in 1990, for an essay about his brief experience as a NATO consultant.

His mentors include his doctoral advisor and the director of the Andrew project, Jim Morris, and Einar Stefferud, who initiated the MIME and First Virtual work.

Personal life
Borenstein lives with his wife, Trina, in Ann Arbor and Greenbush, Michigan; they have four grown daughters, and five grandchildren.  He has been a vegetarian since 1972.  He is a pacifist, named his web server and wireless network "ahimsa", and has worked for a mix of pacifist, leftist, and libertarian causes.

He was a child prodigy and had finished most of his high school curriculum by the end of third grade, before being restricted to studies at his own grade level beginning in fourth grade.  In 1973, with the help of the ACLU, he became the first US student ever to be awarded money damages from his principal and school board, in Bexley, Ohio, for violating his freedom of speech by sending him home for wearing a black armband on the second anniversary, in 1972, of the Kent State shootings. He has three brothers, Eliot Borenstein, a Guggenheim Fellowship winner and professor at NYU; Seth Borenstein, Associated Press Senior Science Reporter; and Joe Borenstein, a contractor and investor.

Authored Requests For Comments (RFCs)
 RFC 1341 – MIME (Multipurpose Internet Mail Extensions)
 RFC 1344 – Implications of MIME for Internet Mail Gateways
 RFC 1437 – The Extension of MIME Content-Types to a new Medium (April Fools' Day RFC)
 RFC 1524 – A User Agent Configuration Mechanism for Multimedia Mail Format Information
 RFC 2045 – MIME Part One: Format of Internet Message Bodies
 RFC 2046 – MIME Part Two: Media Types
 RFC 2049 – MIME Part Five: Conformance Criteria and Examples

References

1957 births
American computer businesspeople
American computer programmers
American computer scientists
Carnegie Mellon University alumni
Deep Springs College alumni
Grinnell College alumni
Hebrew University of Jerusalem alumni
Internet Society people
Living people
Ohio State University alumni
People in information technology